Wogan is a surname of Welsh origin. Notable people with the surname include:

Christopher Wogan, US politician
Edward Wogan, Irish soldier of the mid seventeenth century
John Wogan (1588–1644), Welsh politician
John Wogan (Justiciar of Ireland)
Larry Wogan (1890 – 1979), rugby union player
Lewis Wogan (c.1649 – 1702), High Sheriff of Pembrokeshire
Terry Wogan (1938–2016), radio DJ and television presenter
Thomas Wogan (born circa 1620), Welsh politician
William Wogan (Custos Rotulorum) (died 1625), Custos Rotulorum of Pembrokeshire
William Wogan (religious writer) (1678 – 1758)

As a forename
 Wogan Philipps, 2nd Baron Milford

Surnames of Welsh origin